Lake Ōkāreka (also spelled Okareka) is one of four small lakes lying between Lake Rotorua and Lake Tarawera, in the Bay of Plenty Region of New Zealand's North Island. The others are Lake Rotokakahi (Green Lake), Lake Tikitapu (Blue Lake), and Lake Okataina. All lie within the Okataina caldera, along its western edge.

Geography

Its outlet flows underground for half a mile and forms the Waitangi waterfall. In fact, the Ōkāreka lake seems to be connected with Tarawera by underground channels.

History
This small and little-visited lake is surrounded by hills nearly everywhere, and is a heavy hunting area. It is quite near, but out of sight from the tourist motor route of Rotorua and Tarawera. A side road, Tarawera Road, gives access to it. During the late 19th century, settlers acquired some of the land around it, and built houses on Ōkāreka. Some of the frontage is still in private hands, but the greater part of the basin in which the lake lies has now become residential property.

Ōkāreka means "the lake of sweet food". It was first described in print by Sir George Grey, who visited it on the course of his travels through Rotorua to Taupo in 1849-1850. The route from Ohinemutu to Tarawera was a track which skirted the shore of Ōkāreka and reached the large lake, near the mission station called Galilei. Grey's journal reads:

Grey is also presumed to have introduced Dama Wallaby to the area around Ōkāreka, where they presently still pose a problem.

The shores of Ōkāreka were a scene of Māori life. Cultivations along the lake were common, and Māori fished the waters for whitebait, koura crayfish and toitoi, which were common species in Lake Ōkāreka before Brown trout was introduced. In the 1860s, Alfred Domett visited Ōkāreka and Tarawera, following a similar path to the one that Grey took.

Known for its natural environment, this lake has an adjacent settlement of approximately 600 people. The lake is accessible from the tourist location of Rotorua. The forest nearby to Lake Ōkāreka extends to the western side of Lake Okataina and the Whakapoungakau Range.

Pollution
Lake Ōkāreka has reasonably clear, clean water and is used extensively for recreation such as boating, swimming and fishing. However, the quality of the water has been declining over recent years due to excess levels of nitrogen and phosphorus. These nutrients come from surrounding farmland, residential septic tanks and from the release of existing and accumulated nutrients from sediments on the lake bed.

The Lake Ōkāreka Catchment Management Plan was developed in 2004. This is a long-term plan to improve the water quality of the 
lake, through changes like sewage reticulation, in-lake chemical treatment and farm nutrient management. It has been calculated that 
the load nutrients needed to reach the target TLI of 3.0 are 2.5 tonnes per year of nitrogen and 0.08 tonnes per year of phosphorus.

The Trophic Level Index (TLI) is an overall indication of lake health based on a number of different criteria, values represent a three-yearly average. Better quality sites have a lower TLI. The three-yearly average for Ōkāreka indicates little change over the last five years.

Lake Okareka township
Lake Okareka township is part of the larger Kaingaroa-Whakarewarewa statistical area.

The township had a population of 519 at the 2018 New Zealand census, a decrease of 18 people (−3.4%) since the 2013 census, and unchanged since the 2006 census. There were 183 households, comprising 255 males and 258 females, giving a sex ratio of 0.99 males per female, with 102 people (19.7%) aged under 15 years, 75 (14.5%) aged 15 to 29, 246 (47.4%) aged 30 to 64, and 87 (16.8%) aged 65 or older.

Ethnicities were 94.2% European/Pākehā, 10.4% Māori, 2.3% Pacific peoples, 1.7% Asian, and 1.2% other ethnicities. People may identify with more than one ethnicity.

Although some people chose not to answer the census's question about religious affiliation, 54.9% had no religion, 38.2% were Christian and 0.6% had other religions.

Of those at least 15 years old, 186 (44.6%) people had a bachelor's or higher degree, and 36 (8.6%) people had no formal qualifications. 126 people (30.2%) earned over $70,000 compared to 17.2% nationally. The employment status of those at least 15 was that 210 (50.4%) people were employed full-time, 75 (18.0%) were part-time, and 9 (2.2%) were unemployed.

See also
Lakes of New Zealand

References

External links

Environment Bay of Plenty - Regional Council page
Lake Okareka Ratepayers' & Residents' Association

Lakes of the Bay of Plenty Region
Okataina Volcanic Centre
Volcanic crater lakes